The World Innovation Summit for Education (WISE) is an international initiative aimed at transforming education through innovation. WISE was established by Qatar Foundation in 2009 under the patronage of its chairperson, Sheikha Mozah bint Nasser. With a biennial Summit held in Doha, and a range of year-round initiatives, WISE's mission revolves around promoting new approaches to education and investigating new ways to address pressing global education challenges.

The Biennial Summit 

The 3-day WISE Summit is held every 2 years in Doha, Qatar. It unites over 1,500 experts, researchers, and innovators from multiple sectors worldwide to foster new collaborations and develop solutions with the goal of inspiring creative changes in education. The summit is currently organized by Stavros Yiannouka and his team. Each summit has a distinct theme. The first summit was held in 2009 under the theme "Global Education: Working Together for Sustainable Achievements". The 2019 WISE Summit was held on 19–21 November under the theme, "UnLearn, ReLearn: What it means to be Human."

The WISE Prize for Education
The WISE Prize for Education is an international prize that rewards an individual or a team for outstanding contributions to education. The inaugural edition was launched in 2011 with a monetary award of $500,000.

Selection criteria for the prize stipulates that the laureate's work should have had a significant and lasting impact at any level of education. The laureate is selected by an international jury of education stakeholders and announced at the annual Summit.

The first WISE Prize was awarded to Fazle Hasan Abed, founder and chairman of BRAC (Bangladesh Rural Advancement Committee). The second prize, in 2012, went to Madhav Chavan, co-founder and CEO of India-based NGO Pratham. The third WISE Prize laureate, announced at the 2013 Summit, was Vicky Colbert, founder and director of Fundacion Escuela Nueva in Colombia. Ann Cotton, an advocate of girls' education, was awarded the 2014 prize. Dr. Sakena Yacoobi was awarded the 2015 prize. The 2017 prize was awarded to the founder and president of Ashesi University in Ghana, Dr. Patrick Awuah. Larry Rosenstock was recognized with the prize in 2019. The most recent prize was awarded to Wendy Kopp in 2021.

Other activities

The WISE Awards
Each year the WISE Awards recognize and promote six projects that address global educational challenges. A pre-jury composed of education experts assesses submissions and selects a shortlist of fifteen finalists. Following this, a jury chooses the six award-winning projects. Winners receive a cash prize of $20,000. The first WISE Awards were handed out in 2009.

WISE Research 
The WISE Research Reports bring key topics to the forefront of the global education debate, and reflect the priorities of the Qatar National Research Strategy. The reports are produced in collaboration with recognized experts and organizations from around the world.

WISE Books
WISE Books are aimed at supporting innovative thinking in education. As of October 2014, WISE has published three books addressing educational topics. WISE Book authors and photographers travel to several countries in an attempt to identify the challenges and illustrate the impact of initiatives and practices that are making tangible differences. The third book to be released by WISE, Learning (Re)Imagined - How the connected society is transforming learning focuses on the link between technology and education.

WISE Learners' Voice
Learners' voice, inaugurated in 2010, is a program that aims to reshape students' perception of education. Each year, a selected group of young people, aged 18–25, participate at the annual summit by engaging in debates and making presentations. Workshop sessions are also held throughout the year. In late 2013, 36 new learners joined the existing network of 78 learners from previous years.

WISE Accelerator
The accelerator is a support and advisory program with the aim of developing early-stage projects in education. The program, founded in 2014, seeks to assist projects that have a high potential for scalability and a positive impact on the field of education. The program selects five innovative projects from a variety of countries every year.

The past participants of the program, including country of origin and date of creation:

Partners
The WISE initiative has cooperation agreements with the following institutions in major education issues: Agence universitaire de la Francophonie (AUF), the Association of Commonwealth Universities (ACU), the Institute of International Education (IIE), the International Association of University Presidents (IAUP), RAND Corporation, and the United Nations Educational, Scientific and Cultural Organization (UNESCO).

See also
 Qatar Foundation
 Education in Qatar
 Education City, Qatar

References

External links
 Official website for WISE
 Official website for WISE Prize for Education
 Official website for Qatar Foundation

Education in Qatar
2009 establishments in Qatar
Conferences
Education events
Events in Qatar